The Desert Rider is a 1929 American silent Western film directed by Nick Grinde and written by Harry Sinclair Drago and Oliver Drake.  The film stars Tim McCoy, Raquel Torres, Bert Roach, Edward Connelly, Harry Woods and Jess Cavin. The film was released on May 11, 1929, by Metro-Goldwyn-Mayer.

Cast
 Tim McCoy as Jed Tyler
 Raquel Torres as Dolores Alvarado
 Bert Roach as Friar Bernardo
 Edward Connelly as Padre Quintada
 Harry Woods as Williams
 Jess Cavin as Black Bailey

References

External links 
 

1929 films
1920s English-language films
1929 Western (genre) films
Metro-Goldwyn-Mayer films
Films directed by Nick Grinde
American black-and-white films
Silent American Western (genre) films
1920s American films